Jean-Baptiste Alaize (born 10 May 1991) is a French athlete with an amputated tibia, who specialises in sprint and long jump. He represented France at the 2016 Paralympic Games.

Early life
Alaize was born in Burundi, in 1991, just days before the Burundian Civil War broke out. At three years old, the conflict required one of his legs to be amputated. He arrived in France 12 July 1998, to receive a prosthesis and remained in Montpellier. He runs with this carbon prosthesis specially designed for handisport. He entered INSEP in 2010 .

He is a member of the 'Lollipop suckers' club, a group of more than 90 famous elite created by Peace and Sport, a Monaco-based international organization placed under the High Patronage of H.S.H Prince Albert II. This group of top level champions, wish to make sport a tool for dialogue and social cohesion.
http://www.peace-sport.org/our-champions-of-peace/

Career 
Alaize has been long jump world champion four times, for athletes under 23 years. He joined the Elite French Team for the first time in January 2011 during the Handisport World Championship, at Christchurch (New Zealand), when he achieved a sixth place in long jump and eighth place in 200m sprint.

Personal records
 60 m : 7 s 60 (February 25, 2012)
 100 m : 11 s 80 (July 29, 2011)
 200 m : 24 s 28 (June 22, 2012)
 Long jump : 6,81 m (June 28, 2016)

Prize list
World Championship younger than 23

Long jump
  2007 World champion
  2009 World champion and record man
  2010 World champion and world record man

100 meter sprint
  third in 2008 
  second in 2009
  third in 2010

200 meter sprint 
 third in 2008

Documentary 
Jean-Baptiste Alaize's story of overcoming adversity is told in the Netflix documentary Rising Phoenix, where he is featured among nine Paralympians.

References

External links 
 
 

1991 births
Living people
French male sprinters
French male long jumpers
Paralympic athletes of France
Athletes (track and field) at the 2016 Summer Paralympics
20th-century French people
21st-century French people